In mathematics, the Cayley–Dickson construction, named after Arthur Cayley and Leonard Eugene Dickson, produces a sequence of algebras over the field of real numbers, each with twice the dimension of the previous one. The algebras produced by this process are known as Cayley–Dickson algebras, for example complex numbers, quaternions, and octonions. These examples are useful composition algebras frequently applied in mathematical physics.

The Cayley–Dickson construction defines a new algebra as a Cartesian product of an algebra with itself, with multiplication defined in a specific way (different from the componentwise multiplication) and an involution known as conjugation.  The product of an element and its conjugate (or sometimes the square root of this product) is called the norm.

The symmetries of the real field disappear as the Cayley–Dickson construction is repeatedly applied: first losing order, then commutativity of multiplication, associativity of multiplication, and next alternativity.

More generally, the Cayley–Dickson construction takes any algebra with involution to another algebra with involution of twice the dimension.

Hurwitz's theorem (composition algebras) states that the reals, complex numbers, quaternions, and octonions are the only (normed) division algebras (over the real numbers).

Synopsis

The Cayley–Dickson construction is due to Leonard Dickson in 1919 showing how the octonions can be constructed as a two-dimensional algebra over quaternions. In fact, starting with a field F, the construction yields a sequence of F-algebras of dimension 2n. For n = 2 it is an associative algebra called a quaternion algebra, and for n = 3 it is an alternative algebra called an octonion algebra.  These instances n = 1, 2 and 3 produce composition algebras as shown below. 

The case n = 1  starts with elements (a, b) in F × F and defines the conjugate (a, b)* to be (a*, –b) where a* = a in case n = 1, and subsequently determined by the formula. The essence of the F-algebra lies in the definition of  the product of two  elements (a, b) and (c, d):

Proposition 1: For  and  the conjugate of the product is 
proof: 
Proposition 2: If the F-algebra is associative and ,then 
proof:  + terms that cancel by the associative property.

Stages in construction of real algebras

Details of the construction of the classical real algebras are as follows:

Complex numbers as ordered pairs 

 

A complex number whose second component is zero is associated with a real number: the complex number  is associated with the real number .

 

since  is a real number and is its own conjugate.

The conjugate has the property that

 

which is a non-negative real number.  In this way, conjugation defines a norm, making the complex numbers a normed vector space over the real numbers:  the norm of a complex number  is

 

Furthermore, for any non-zero complex number , conjugation gives a multiplicative inverse,

 

As a complex number consists of two independent real numbers, they form a two-dimensional vector space over the real numbers.

Besides being of higher dimension, the complex numbers can be said to lack one algebraic property of the real numbers: a real number is its own conjugate.

Quaternions 

The next step in the construction is to generalize the multiplication and conjugation operations.

 

Slight variations on this formula are possible; the resulting constructions will yield structures identical up to the signs of bases.

The order of the factors seems odd now, but will be important in the next step.

 

The product of a nonzero element with its conjugate is a non-negative real number:

 

As before, the conjugate thus yields a norm and an inverse for any such ordered pair.  So in the sense we explained above, these pairs constitute an algebra something like the real numbers.  They are the quaternions, named by Hamilton in 1843.

As a quaternion consists of two independent complex numbers, they form a four-dimensional vector space over the real numbers.

Octonions 

All the steps to create further algebras are the same from octonions on.

 

Note, however, that because the quaternions are not commutative, the order of the factors in the multiplication formula becomes important—if the last factor in the multiplication formula were  rather than
, the formula for multiplication of an element by its conjugate would not yield a real number.

For exactly the same reasons as before, the conjugation operator yields a norm and a multiplicative inverse of any nonzero element.

This algebra was discovered by John T. Graves in 1843, and is called the octonions or the "Cayley numbers".

As an octonion consists of two independent quaternions, they form an eight-dimensional vector space over the real numbers.

For the reason of this non-associativity, octonions have no matrix representation.

Further algebras 

The algebra immediately following the octonions is called the sedenions.  It retains an algebraic property called power associativity, meaning that if  is a sedenion, but loses the property of being an alternative algebra and hence cannot be a composition algebra.

The Cayley–Dickson construction can be carried on ad infinitum, at each step producing a power-associative algebra whose dimension is double that of the algebra of the preceding step.  All the algebras generated in this way over a field are quadratic: that is, each element satisfies a quadratic equation with coefficients from the field.

In 1954 R. D. Schafer examined the algebras generated by the Cayley–Dickson process over a field  and showed they satisfy the flexible identity.

Modified Cayley–Dickson construction 

There are also composition algebras whose norm is an isotropic quadratic form, which are obtained through a slight modification, by replacing the minus sign in the definition of the product of ordered pairs with a plus sign, as follows:

Applying the original Cayley–Dickson construction to the split-complexes also results in the split-quaternions and then the split-octonions.

General Cayley–Dickson construction 
 
In this construction,  is an algebra with involution, meaning:
  is an abelian group under 
  has a product that is left and right distributive over 
The algebra  produced by the Cayley–Dickson construction is also an algebra with involution.

 inherits properties from  unchanged as follows. 
 If  has an identity , then  has an identity .
 If  has the property that ,  associate and commute with all elements, then so does . This property implies that any element generates a commutative associative *-algebra, so in particular the algebra is power associative.
 
Other properties of  only induce weaker properties of :
 If  is commutative and has trivial involution, then  is commutative.
 If  is commutative and associative then  is associative.

Notes

References 
  (see p. 171)
 . (See "Section 2.2, The Cayley–Dickson Construction")
 
 
  (the following reference gives the English translation of this book)

Further reading
 

Composition algebras
Historical treatment of quaternions